Teso District is a defunct administrative district in the former Western Province of Kenya. Its capital town was Amagoro, next to Malaba a border town between Kenya and Uganda. The district had one electoral constituency, Amagoro Constituency. Alupe Leprosy Hospital is located in this former district.

References

 
Former districts of Kenya